Elektrik Su Havagazı Otobüs Troleybüs or ESHOT is a bus service operating in the İzmir. ESHOT, along with İZULAŞ are the two main bus transit service in İzmir. Buses serve all districts, however, denser network presence attained in the central area. ESHOT is owned by the İzmir Municipality (İBB).

History
Before ESHOT was formed, all of İzmir's public services were operated by several companies. ESHOT Genel Müdürlüğü was formed on July 27, 1943 to take over the İzmir Tram and Electric Company. This company operated all trams, trolleybuses and electric facilities in the city. In 1945, ESHOT took over the İzmir Coal Gas Company and on June 5, 1947 ESHOT took over the İzmir Suları A.Ş. to have control over all the cities main facilities. ESHOT started printing their own paper on June 11, 1957 for new information on all public utilities. By 1959, ESHOT began producing refurbished buses under the direction of Ismail Faruk Paksoy, director of Eshot.  In the 1960s the Kordon trolley line was abandoned. ESHOT started operating province wide starting December 11, 1980. On September 12, 1982 the Turkish Electric Company took over all electric operations from ESHOT. The İzmir Municipality became the parent company of ESHOT on June 27, 1984. İZSU Company was formed on March 25, 1987 to operate all water facilities in İzmir and on July 1, 1987 ESHOT turned over all water operations to İZSU. On September 1, 1994, the Coal gas factory in Alsancak closed down leaving ESHOT only in-charge of city bus operations.

Connections
ESHOT has many interchanges with the national railway carrier, the Turkish State Railways, the city metro system, the İzmir Metro, the city ferry system, and the 2 city airports.

Routes

ESHOT has many routes. Some of the routes are:
 8 Güzelbahçe-Fahrettin Altay Terminus via Mithatpaşa Avenue
 18 Vatan-Yeşilyurt-Konak via Üçyol
 23 Uzundere-Konak via Eski İzmir Street, Eşrefpaşa (goes through Çankaya on return trip: this is a quasi-loop line)
 60 Pınarbaşı-Kemer via former Kemalpaşa road
 70 Tınaztepe-Halkapınar via Buca, Eşrefpaşa, Çankaya, Alsancak
 80 Arapdere-Halkapınar via Bozyaka, Eşrefpaşa, Çankaya, Alsancak
 90 Gaziemir-Halkapınar via Yeşillik Road, Eşrefpaşa, Çankaya, Alsancak
 104 Tınaztepe-Konak via Adatepe, Buca, Menderes Avenue, Eşrefpaşa (looping on return through Çankaya)
 118 ESHOT-Evka 4 via Yeşillik Avenue, Yeşildere, Çamkıran, Osmangazi
 147 Postacılar-Halkapınar via Yeni Girne Boulevard, Bayraklı by the railway
 152 Gaziemir-Konak via Yeşillik Avenue, Üçyol
 193 Yurtoğlu-Konak via Cennetçeşme, Rasime Şeyhoğlu Street, Eski İzmir, Eşrefpaşa
 226 Atatürk OIZ-Bostanlı Express
 240 Elit Sitesi-Halkapınar via Yeni Girne, Altınyol
 249 Evka 4-Kemer Station via Osmangazi, Adalet Neighbourhood, Fatih Avenue
 304 Tınaztepe-Konak Atatürk Arts Center via Hasanağa, Menderes Avenue, Konak Tunnel
 390 Tınaztepe-Bornova via Dokuz Eylül University, Otoyol 30 (limited service express)
 443 Egekent-Bostanlı Pier via Çiğli, Cahar Dudayev Road
 510 Gaziemir-Balçova via Otoyol 30
 515 Tınaztepe-Bornova via Buca, Yeşildere, Mersinli, Manavkuyu
 565 Evka 4-Bornova via İnönü Neighbourhood
 599 Cengizhan-Halkapınar via Muhittin Erener, Bayraklı
 681 Fahrettin Altay terminus-Basmane via Hatay, Çankaya
 690 Tınaztepe-Fahrettin Altay terminus via Dokuz Eylül University, Otoyol 30, Mehmetçik Road (limited service express)
 800 Menemen Railway Station-İzmir Bus Station via D550, D300 collectors, Otoyol 5, Otoyol 30
 912 Balatçık-Alsancak Station via Çiğli, Altınyol
 921 Bostanlı Pier-Alsancak Station via Seaside road
 969 Balçova-Fahrettin Altay via Teleferik, İkiztepe

Color coding 

ESHOT has a color coding to distinguish which depot a bus come from. ESHOT stickers bearing colored ESHOT emblem and the acronym "ESHOT" are glued on the upper-right part of the windscreen and upper-middle part of rear-view glass on every ESHOT line bus.

See also
Trolleybuses in Izmir

References

External links
 eshot saatleri (Turkish)

Public transport in Turkey
İzmir Province
Transport operators of Turkey